Tatar Book Publishers is a Soviet and Russian regional state-owned publishing house located in Tatarstan. It predominantly prints books in the Tatar language and is the largest publishing house among those specializing in literature in regional languages of Russia as well as one of the largest publishing houses in Tatarstan. Tatar Book Publishers publishes fiction and children's literature, textbooks, academic publications.

Its current name dates back to 1958 when it became the principal publishing house of the Tatar Autonomous Soviet Socialist Republic. In 2018 the Publisher had 190 permanent commercial partners.

On top of school subject textbooks, ordered by Tatarstan ministry of education and science for schools using Tatar as a medium of instruction, as well as some privately ordered or grant-funded books, the publishing house printed 106 titles (of them 32 children's literature) in 2018, and 103 (28) in 2019.

Gallery

References

External links 
 Karimullin Abrar. Tatar state publishing house and Tatar Book of Russia (1917-1932).

Book publishing companies of Russia
Publishing companies of the Soviet Union
1919 establishments in Russia
Publishing companies established in 1919
Companies based in Kazan